Chakwal Tehsil , is an administrative subdivision (tehsil) of Chakwal District in the Punjab province of Pakistan. The tehsil is subdivided into 30 Union Councils - five of which form the capital Chakwal. During British rule the tehsil was part of Jhelum District, according to the 1901 census the population was 160,316 compared to 164,912 in 1891. At the time the tehsil contained 248 villages.

References

Tehsils of Punjab, Pakistan
Chakwal District